Cementerio Civil de Ponce (Ponce Civil Cemetery), a.k.a., Cementerio Municipal de Ponce, is a historic burial ground in Ponce, Puerto Rico. It was founded in 1901.  It was designed by Manuel V. Domenech. Some of the people buried at Cementerio Civil include Ruth Fernández, Isabel la Negra and Héctor Lavoe. It is believed to be the largest cemetery in Puerto Rico.

The cemetery is also home to the Monumento a los heroes de El Polvorín (Monument to the El Polvorin Heroes). It is located in Barrio Portugues Urbano at N 18.01327 W 66.63286 (18° 0' 47.7714" N, 66° 37' 58.2954" W).

Notable interments
 Ruth Fernández, singer and politician
 Isabel la Negra, brothel owner, philanthropist
 Héctor Lavoe, salsa and bolero singer
 Rafael Rivera Esbrí, politician
 Herminia Tormes García, first female Puerto Rican judge of Puerto Rico.
 Orlando McFarlane, MLB player for the Pittsburgh Pirates
 Antonio Correa Cotto, outlaw

See also

 Cementerio Católico San Vicente de Paul
 Museo del Autonomismo Puertorriqueño
 Panteón Nacional Román Baldorioty de Castro

Notes

References

External links

 

Cultural history of Puerto Rico
Spanish Revival architecture
1901 establishments in Puerto Rico
Cemeteries in Ponce, Puerto Rico